Boardtown Creek is a stream in the U.S. state of Georgia. It is a tributary to the Ellijay River.

Boardtown Creek took its name from an American Indian village which once stood near its course.

References

Rivers of Georgia (U.S. state)
Rivers of Fannin County, Georgia
Rivers of Gilmer County, Georgia